Ivory Coast participated at the 2018 Summer Youth Olympics in Buenos Aires, Argentina from 6 October to 18 October 2018.

Competitors

Archery

Individual

Team

Athletics

Taekwondo

References

2018 in Ivorian sport
Nations at the 2018 Summer Youth Olympics
Ivory Coast at the Youth Olympics